Bryan Crimmins (25 October 1919 – 15 February 1998) was a former Australian rules footballer who played with Melbourne in the Victorian Football League (VFL). He was the father of Peter Crimmins.

Notes

External links 

1919 births
Australian rules footballers from Victoria (Australia)
Melbourne Football Club players
1998 deaths